Idaea ferrilinea is a species of moth of the  family Geometridae. It is found in Australia.

References

Sterrhini
Moths of Australia
Moths described in 1900